"Australia" is a song by Welsh alternative rock band Manic Street Preachers, released on 2 December 1996 through Epic Records as the fourth and final single from the fourth studio album, Everything Must Go (1996). The song peaked on number seven in the UK Singles Chart and was the fourth consecutive top-10 hit for the band.

Background
The sentiment of the song is that Australia is just about the furthest one can go to get away from their home in Wales and is a metaphor for Nicky Wire's desire to escape from the emotional turmoil caused by the disappearance of his close friend and co-lyricist, Richey Edwards.

The music helps the lyrics convey the sense of freedom, featuring heavy guitar sound coupled with a raw emotion, and a crescendo bolstered by Sean Moore's drumming.

Release
On 14 December 1996, "Australia" reached number seven on the UK Singles Chart, giving Manic Street Preachers their fourth consecutive top-10 hit, and charted for nine weeks. With this, all singles from Everything Must Go charted within the top 10 in the UK. It also made an appearance on Forever Delayed, the band's greatest hits album, released in November 2002.

The first CD included "Velocity Girl", "Take the Skinheads Bowling" and "Can't Take My Eyes Off You" (all three being cover versions of songs originally performed by Primal Scream, Camper Van Beethoven and Frankie Valli, respectively) and the cassette featured a live recording of "A Design for Life". All 3 of the CD cover versions would later feature on the Lipstick Traces compilation album in 2003 (although it is believed "Take the Skinheads Bowling" was re-recorded, yet it sounds identical and may be mis-labelled as (c) 2003, or otherwise may be presented in a new mix).

Legacy
In October 2011, NME placed "Australia" at number 150 on its list of "the 150 Best Tracks of the Past 15 Years". The song was the theme tune to the Nickelodeon UK sitcom Renford Rejects and has also been used in adverts for the Australian Tourist Commission.

Track listings
All music was written by James Dean Bradfield and Sean Moore except where indicated. All lyrics were written by Nicky Wire except where indicated.

Charts

References

1996 singles
1996 songs
Epic Records singles
Manic Street Preachers songs
Songs about Australia
Song recordings produced by Mike Hedges
Songs written by James Dean Bradfield
Songs written by Nicky Wire
Songs written by Sean Moore (musician)